Dillon County is a county located in the U.S. state of South Carolina. As of the 2020 census, the county's population was 28,292, down from 32,062 in 2010. The county seat is Dillon.

Founded in 1910 from a portion of Marion County, both Dillon County and the city of Dillon were named for prosperous local citizen James W. Dillon (1826-1913), an Irishman who settled there and led a campaign to bring the railroad into the community. The result of this effort was the construction of the Wilson Short Cut Railroad, which later became part of the Atlantic Coast Line Railroad. It stimulated greater prosperity directly linking Dillon County to the national network of railroads.

Geography

It is the fifth-smallest county in South Carolina by area.

State and local protected areas/sites 
 Bass Community Park
 Dillon County Museum
 Little Pee Dee State Park

Major water bodies 
 Cud Swamp
 Great Pee Dee River
 Little Pee Dee River
 Lumber River
 Maidendown Swamp
 Reedy Creek

Adjacent counties
 Robeson County, North Carolina - north
 Columbus County, North Carolina - north
 Horry County - east
 Marion County - south
 Florence County - southwest
 Marlboro County - west

Major highways 

  (Concurrency with US 501)

Major infrastructure 
 Dillon Station
 Inland Port Dillon, major rail depot in the county

Demographics

2020 census

As of the 2020 United States census, there were 28,292 people, 11,029 households, and 7,016 families residing in the county.

2010 census
As of the 2010 United States Census, there were 32,062 people, 11,923 households, and 8,342 families living in the county. The racial makeup of the county was 48.0% white, 46.1% black or African American, 2.5% American Indian, 0.2% Asian, 1.5% from other races, and 1.6% from two or more races. Those of Hispanic or Latino origin made up 2.6% of the population. In terms of ancestry, 13.5% were American, 6.5% were English, and 5.4% were Irish.

Of the 11,923 households, 36.5% had children under the age of 18 living with them, 40.2% were married couples living together, 23.9% had a female householder with no husband present, 30.0% were non-families, and 26.5% of all households were made up of individuals. The average household size was 2.65 and the average family size was 3.20. The median age was 36.7 years.

The median income for a household in the county was $26,818 and the median income for a family was $34,693. Males had a median income of $31,973 versus $22,100 for females. The per capita income for the county was $14,684. About 26.2% of families and 30.5% of the population were below the poverty line, including 43.8% of those under age 18 and 23.7% of those age 65 or over.

2000 census
As of the census of 2000, there were 30,722 people, 11,199 households, and 8,063 families living in the county.  The population density was 76 people per square mile (29/km2).  There were 12,679 housing units at an average density of 31 per square mile (12/km2).  The racial makeup of the county was 47% White, 49% Black or African American, 2.21% Native American, 0.34% Asian, 0.03% Pacific Islander, 0.99% from other races, and 0.70% from two or more races.  1.75% of the population were Hispanic or Latino of any race.

There were 11,199 households, out of which 34.60% had children under the age of 18 living with them, 44.80% were married couples living together, 22.30% had a female householder with no husband present, and 28.00% were non-families. 25.10% of all households were made up of individuals, and 9.90% had someone living alone who was 65 years of age or older.  The average household size was 2.71 and the average family size was 3.24.

In the county, the population was spread out, with 29.10% under the age of 18, 9.50% from 18 to 24, 27.50% from 25 to 44, 22.40% from 45 to 64, and 11.50% who were 65 years of age or older.  The median age was 34 years. For every 100 females there were 87.40 males.  For every 100 females age 18 and over, there were 81.60 males.

The median income for a household in the county was $26,630, and the median income for a family was $32,690. Males had a median income of $26,908 versus $18,007 for females. The per capita income for the county was $13,272.  About 19.40% of families and 24.20% of the population were below the poverty line, including 33.30% of those under age 18 and 26.60% of those age 65 or over.

Government and politics

Attractions
 South of the Border
 Little Pee Dee State Park
 Dillon County Museum

Communities

Cities
 Dillon (county seat and largest city)

Towns
 Lake View
 Latta

Census-designated places
 Floydale
 Hamer
 Little Rock
 Newtown

Other unincorporated communities

 Bass Crossroads
 Berrys Crossroads
 Bingham
 Bronson Crossroads
 Bunker Hill
 Carmichael Crossroads
 Carolina
 Carter Landing
 Centerville
 Cotton Valley
 Dalcho
 Dothan
 Dunbarton
 Five Forks
 Fork
 Forrest Hills
 Gaddys Crossroads
 Gaddys Mill
 Galavon
 Hayestown
 High Hill Crossroads
Jacksonville
 Judson
 Kemper
 Kentyre
 Linkside
 Mallory
 Mallory Beach
 Manning Crossroads
 May Hilltop
 McCormick Crossroads
 Minturn
 Mount Calvary
 Newtown
 Oak Grove
 Oakland Crossroads
 Oliver Crossroads
 Pittman Corner
 Riverdale
 Selma
 Sinclair Crossroads
 South of the Border
 Squires
 Squires Curve
 Temperance Hill

See also
 List of counties in South Carolina
 National Register of Historic Places listings in Dillon County, South Carolina
 South Carolina State Parks

References

Further reading

External links

 
 
 Dillon County History and Images

 
1910 establishments in South Carolina
Populated places established in 1910
Majority-minority counties in South Carolina